Samuel de Luque Batuecas (born 12 April 1989), known online as Vegetta777, is a Spanish gaming YouTuber known  for his videos about different games and variety of content. His YouTube channel is the 2nd most-subscribed channel from Spain. He currently lives in Andorra.

Biography 
Samuel de Luque Batuecas was born on 12 April 1989 en Alcorcon. He studied nursing in the city of Madrid, Spain a course from which he graduated.

In August 2013 he founded his company Luque Social Gamer SL, his mother Ines Batuecas is the sole administrator of the company since May 2016. Since 2015 together with his colleague Willyrex he has published several books in the "Wigetta" series.

References

1989 births
Living people
People from Madrid
Spanish YouTubers
Spanish-language YouTubers
Spanish emigrants to Andorra
YouTube channels launched in 2008
Gaming YouTubers